Christopher H. Mathis is an American attorney and politician serving as a member of the Arizona House of Representatives from the 18th district. He previously represented the 9th district, and assumed office on December 7, 2021, succeeding Randy Friese.

Education 
Mathis earned a Bachelor of Arts degree in history from the University of Illinois Urbana–Champaign, a Juris Doctor from the University of Illinois College of Law, a Master of Public Administration from the Harvard Kennedy School, and a Master of Public Health from the Harvard T.H. Chan School of Public Health.

Career 
Prior to joining the legislature, Mathis has worked as an elder law and estate planning attorney and a professor at the James E. Rogers College of Law. He also worked as a health care legislative assistant to U.S. Senator Chuck Hagel and as professional staff in the Health Care Policy Department at Harvard Medical School.

References

External links
 Official page at the Arizona State Legislature
 Biography at Ballotpedia

21st-century American politicians
Living people
Democratic Party members of the Arizona House of Representatives
Arizona lawyers
University of Illinois Urbana-Champaign alumni
University of Illinois College of Law alumni
Harvard University alumni
Harvard Kennedy School alumni
University of Arizona faculty
Year of birth missing (living people)